Tomorrow We Dance is a 1982 Italian comedy film written, directed and starring Maurizio Nichetti.

Plot 
Aliens send a hypnotic signal through a TV channel, and the signal makes people dance and makes them forget their fears.

Cast 
 Mariangela Melato as Mariangela 
 Maurizio Nichetti as Maurizio 
 Paolo Stoppa as the father
 Elisa Cegani as the mother

See also
 List of Italian films of 1982

References

External links

1982 films
Films directed by Maurizio Nichetti
1980s science fiction comedy films
Italian science fiction comedy films
1982 comedy films
1980s Italian films